13 & God is a collaboration between American indie hip hop duo Themselves and German indie rock band The Notwist. The group is signed both to Anticon and Alien Transistor.

History
The band's name 13 & God stems from the concept of the 12 apostles and Jesus Christ forming a group that comprises 13 mortal men as well as God. Distinguishing between Themselves and The Notwist in the context of which group is '13' and which is 'God' is thus disingenuous. In the example above, God is inherently contained within '13', creating a symbiotic relationship so strong it is unable to be severed. As 13 & God are not a Christian group, but do explore elements of philosophy, spirituality and existentialism, the name 13 & God is generally considered to be more of a reflection of those elements, as well as the concept of 'identity' itself. Alternatively, it may just be a play on words with the prematurely sexy track by Boogie Down Productions titled '13 and Good' '

They are joined live by Jordan Dalrymple who now plays Dax Pierson's parts following a 2005 Subtle tour accident which left Dax quadriplegic. As of 2010, Jordan has officially joined, and has been contributing in the studio.

In a 2009 interview with Pitchfork, Doseone was quoted as saying "in 2010 there will be a brand new shiny 13 & G record out in the world." On February 3, 2011, the second album Own Your Ghost was announced to be released on Anticon on May 17, 2011. The album is set to feature ten tracks, including "Sure As Debt" which is a song written and performed on the 2007 tour. This announcement was accompanied by a preview clip of the song "Armored Scarves" from the album.

Discography

Albums
 13 & God (Anticon/Alien Transistor, 2005)
 Own Your Ghost  (Anticon/Alien Transistor, 2011)

Singles
 "Men of Station" (2005)
 "Oldage" (2011)

Live albums
 Live in Japan (2008)

Remixes
 Themselves - "Daxstrong" from CrownsDown & Company (2010)

References

External links
 13 & God on Alien Transistor
 13 & God on Anticon
 13 & God on Myspace
 13 & God on Last.fm
 Doseone interview with The Quietus

American hip hop groups
Anticon artists
American electronic music groups